Associazione Sportiva Dilettantistica Roccella is an Italian association bocciofila club, based in Roccella Ionica, Calabria.

It currently plays in Serie A.

History

Foundation 
The club was founded in 1935.

Serie D 
In the season 2013–14 the team was promoted for the first time, from Eccellenza Calabria to Serie D.

External links 
 Official homepage 

Football clubs in Calabria
Association football clubs established in 1935
1935 establishments in Italy